A hound is a type of hunting dog used by hunters to track or chase prey.

Description
Hounds can be contrasted with gun dogs that assist hunters by identifying prey and/or recovering shot quarry. The hound breeds were the first hunting dogs. They have either a powerful sense of smell, great speed, or both.

There are three types of hound, with several breeds type:
 Sighthounds (also called gazehounds) follow prey predominantly by speed, keeping it in sight. These dogs are fast and assist hunters in catching game: fox, hare, deer, and elk.
 Scenthounds follow prey or others (like missing people) by tracking its scent. These dogs have endurance, but are not fast runners.
 The remaining breeds of hound follow their prey using both sight and scent. They are difficult to classify, as they are neither strictly sighthounds nor strictly scenthounds.

List of hound breeds

 Afghan Hound
 Africanis
 Alpine Dachsbracke
 American Foxhound
 American Leopard Hound
 Andalusian Hound
 Artois Hound
 Austrian Black and Tan Hound
 Azawakh
 Basenji
 Basset Artesien Normand
 Basset Bleu de Gascogne
 Basset Fauve de Bretagne
 Basset Hound
 Bavarian Mountain Hound
 Beagle
 Beagle-Harrier
 Billy
 Black and Tan Coonhound
 Blackmouth Cur
 Bloodhound
 Bluetick Coonhound
 Borzoi
 Bosnian Broken-haired Hound
 Briquet Griffon Vendéen
 Chippiparai
 Cirneco dell'Etna
 Combai
 Coonhound
 Cretan Hound
 Dachshund
 Drever
 Dumfriesshire Black and Tan Foxhound
 Estonian Hound
 English Coonhound
 English Foxhound
 Feist
 Finnish Hound
 Galgo Español
 Gascon Saintongeois
 German Hound
 Grand Basset Griffon Vendéen
 Grand Bleu de Gascogne
 Grand Fauve de Bretagne
 Grand Griffon Vendéen
 Greek Harehound
 Greyhound
 Griffon Bleu de Gascogne
 Griffon Fauve de Bretagne
 Hamiltonstövare
 Hanover Hound
 Harrier
 Hortaya borzaya
 Ibizan Hound
 Indian pariah dog
 Italian Greyhound
 Irish Wolfhound
 Istrian Coarse-haired Hound
 Istrian Shorthaired Hound
 Kai Ken
 Kanni
 Kishu Ken
 Lakeland Trailhound
 Lithuanian Hound
 Longdog
 Lurcher
 Magyar agár
 Mountain Cur
 Mudhol Hound
 Otterhound
 Petit Basset Griffon Vendéen
 Petit Bleu de Gascogne
 Pharaoh Hound
 Plott Hound
 Podenco Canario
 Polish Greyhound
 Polish Hound
 Portuguese Podengo
 Posavac Hound
 Rajapalayam
 Rampur Greyhound
 Rastreador Brasileiro
 Redbone Coonhound
 Rhodesian Ridgeback
 Sabueso Español
 Saluki
 Schillerstövare
 Segugio dell'Appennino
 Segugio Italiano a pelo forte
 Segugio Italiano a pelo raso
 Segugio Maremmano
 Serbian Hound
 Serbian Tricolour Hound
 Schweizer Laufhund
 Schweizerischer Niederlaufhund
 Scottish Deerhound
 Shikoku
 Silken Windhound
 Sloughi
 Smalandstövare
 Styrian Coarse-haired Hound
 Taigan
 Treeing Walker Coonhound
 Trigg Hound
 Transylvanian Hound
 Tyrolean Hound
 Welsh Foxhound
 Westphalian Dachsbracke
 Whippet

See also 

 Dog type
 Hunting dog
 Scent hound
 Sighthound

References

External links 
 
 

 
Dog types
Hunting dogs
Hunting with hounds
Dog shows and showing